The Gazzirola (also known as Garzirola) is a mountain of the Lugano Prealps on the Swiss-Italian border. Its summit is the highest point of the municipality of Lugano.

SOIUSA classification 
According to the SOIUSA (International Standardized Mountain Subdivision of the Alps) the mountain can be classified in the following way:
 main part = Western Alps
 major sector = North Western Alps
 section = Lugano Prealps
 subsection = Prealpi Comasche
 supergroup = Catena Gino-Camoghè-Fiorina
 group = Gruppo Camoghè-Bar
 subgroup = Sottogruppo del Camoghè
 code = I/B-11.I-A.2.a

Mountain huts 
Not far from the mountain are located three mountain huts: Capanna San Lucio (1,540 m), Rifugio San Lucio (1,554 m) and  Rifugio Garzirola (1,974 m).

Notes

External links
 Gazzirola on Hikr

Mountains of the Alps
Mountains of Switzerland
Mountains of Lombardy
Italy–Switzerland border
International mountains of Europe
Two-thousanders of Italy
Mountains of Ticino
Two-thousanders of Switzerland
Lugano Prealps